Arrhyton redimitum, the Oriente brown-capped racerlet, is a species of snake in the family Colubridae. It is found in Cuba.

References 

Arrhyton
Reptiles described in 1862
Reptiles of Cuba
Taxa named by Edward Drinker Cope